Flowing Home is a Canadian animated short film, directed by Sandra Desmazières and released in 2021. The film tells the story of two sisters in Vietnam who are separated during the Vietnam War, and not reunited for 20 years.

The film was named to the initial shortlist for the Academy Award for Best Animated Short Film, and received a Canadian Screen Award nomination for Best Animated Short at the 10th Canadian Screen Awards in 2022.

References

External links

2021 films
2021 animated films
2021 short films
Canadian animated short films
French animated short films
National Film Board of Canada animated short films
Films about Vietnamese Canadians
2020s English-language films
2020s Canadian films
2020s French films